Sheikh Ibrahim Bin Abdullah Al-Ghaith is the former General President for the Saudi Committee for the Promotion of Virtue and the Prevention of Vice.

References

Living people
Year of birth missing (living people)